The 2021 Inline Speed Skating World Championships was the 69th edition of the Inline Speed Skating World Championships overall and was held in Ibagué, Colombia from 6 to 13 November 2021. It was held in both Elite and Junior categories. It was the 6th edition of the championship to take place in Colombia

Medal summary

Men

Women

Medal table

References

Inline Speed Skating World Championships
Inline Speed Skating World Championships
International sports competitions hosted by Colombia
Inline Speed Skating World Championships